Healy Creek is a stream in Alberta, Canada.

Healy Creek has the name of John J. Healy, a businessperson in the mining industry.

See also
List of rivers of Alberta

References

Rivers of Alberta